Harriet Theresa Comstock (August 12, 1860 – 1943) was an American novelist and author of children's books.

Biography
Comstock was born to Alpheus Smith and Jean A. Downey in Nichols, New York. She received an academic education in Plainfield, New Jersey. In 1885, she married Philip Comstock of Brooklyn, New York.  She started writing in 1895, mostly short stories for magazines and books principally for children.

Works

 Molly, the Drummer Boy (1900)
 A Boy of a Thousand Years Ago (1902)
 A Little Dusky Hero (1902)
 The Queen's Hostage (1906)
 Janet of the Dunes (1908)
 Joyce of the North Woods (1911)
 A Son of the Hills (1913)
 The Place Beyond the Winds (1914)
 The Vindication (1917)
 Mam'selle Jo: A Novel of the St. Lawrence Country (1918)
 Unbroken Lines (1919)
 The Shield of Silence (1921)
 At the Crossroads (1922)
 The Tenth Woman (1923)

References

External links 
 
 
 
 

1860 births
1943 deaths
20th-century American novelists
20th-century American women writers
American children's writers
American women novelists
Novelists from New Jersey
Novelists from New York (state)
People from Nichols, New York
Writers from Plainfield, New Jersey